"High Class" is a song and recorded by American country music artist Eric Paslay. It was released on October 5, 2015. Paslay wrote the song with Corey Crowder and Jesse Frasure.

Content
The song is about two country lovers spending a night in the city.

Critical reception
Website Taste of Country gave the song a positive review, calling it "Eric Paslay’s “High Class” continues the singer’s streak of releasing edgy, blues-soaked country cuts over more middle-of-the-road country-rockers."

Music video
The music video was directed by Wes Edwards and premiered in March 2016.

Chart performance

References

2015 songs
2015 singles
Eric Paslay songs
EMI Records singles
Songs written by Eric Paslay
Songs written by Jesse Frasure
Song recordings produced by Marshall Altman
Songs written by Corey Crowder (songwriter)
Music videos directed by Wes Edwards